Aayiram Vilakku is a 2011 Indian Tamil-language action thriller film directed by S. P. Hosimin, in his second venture, starring  Sathyaraj and Shanthnoo, whilst Sana Khan, Kamal Kamaraju, Ganja Karuppu, and Suman play pivotal roles. The film, produced by HMI Pictures and scored by Srikanth Deva, was released on 23 September 2011. The movie received mixed reviews.

Plot 
The film opens when a child named Tarun starts asking his father Gopal to tell him an interesting story. The father starts saying the story of Lingam, his former adopted father.

Lingam is the don of Madurai, and the people get scared when his name is heard. The police commissioner orders that if Lingam takes part in any of the crimes, then he will be killed. Thus, Lingam takes a decision to build a mill in Aayiram Vilakku Nagar.

Gopal is a man who works in a rice mill. Megha and Gopal love each other and constantly romance. The people in Aayiram Vilakku Nagar accept the deal and move from that place except for Gopal. One day, Lingam's men came to ask for his land, but he rejects the deal. Lingam notices this and decides to adopt Gopal. Gopal's life changes, and he is soon a protector of his adopted father. He is soon a problem for an opposing gang and the police force. They begin to cause trouble for him and Lingam.

The opposing gang challenges Gopal and Lingam to fight. Gopal refuses, and one night at a wedding, he and Megha are chased by the opposing gang and run throughout the village, trying to escape. Gopal kills the henchmen and saves Megha, who was about to get tortured. Gopal and Lingam are then forced to accept the fight with no other choice. Lingam and Gopal get their guns prepared overnight and head to the fields the next morning. Lingam and Gopal both fight with the main villains and kill all of them with their guns and hands.

The police force enters the situation, and soon, Gopal and Megha leave the fields running but are followed by one more villain. The police tells Lingam that if he shoots the villain, he will be killed for all his past crimes. If he does not, he will be cleared of all charges and will return to a normal life. Lingam tells Gopal that a bad guy is behind him, but Gopal does not hear him. The bad guy is just about to stab Gopal, until Lingam shoots the bad guy. Gopal hears the shot and sees the bad guy dead. The officers shoot Lingam. Megha and Gopal run back to Lingam, who says that he was proud of Gopal and wishes for Gopal to take his place as the leader of the dons. Gopal, in tears, accepts, and Lingam dies in Gopal's hands. Gopal is seen later telling Tarun that because of Lingam, they are still living.

Cast

 Sathyaraj as Lingam
 Shanthanu Bhagyaraj as Gopal
 Sana Khan as Megha
 Kamal Kamaraju as Dilli
 Ganja Karuppu as Tyson
 Suman
 Thambi Ramaiah
 Suja 
 Theepetti Ganesan as Arapudi
 Meenal 
 Delhi Ganesh
 Mahadevan as Police officer
 Thalaivasal Vijay
 Bharathi Kannan
 Muraliraj

Production
S. P. Hosimin, who earlier worked as co director to Shankar and also directed the Bharath-starrer February 14, made his comeback and started his next project in 2010. Shanthanu is the lead hero and he would be playing a young man from Madurai. Sathyaraj was selected to play an important role. Sana Khan was selected to play a village belle. The film was started shooting in October 2010.

Soundtrack
The music composed by Srikanth Deva.

References

Indian action thriller films
2011 action thriller films
2010s Tamil-language films
Films scored by Srikanth Deva